Skin lines are anatomical features which include:

 Langer's lines
 Blaschko's lines
 Kraissl's lines